was a Japanese actor. He appeared in the Japanese film Branded to Kill, as Michihiko Yabuhara: the yakuza boss that hires Hanada and seduces his wife. Upon the discovery that his diamond smuggling operation has been burgled, he employs Hanada to execute the guilty parties then adds him to the list when he flubs the job. His final appearance is with a bullet hole in his head.

Tamagawa is also known for his role as the bumbling, but skilled Inspector Ippei Kumano in Super Robot Red Baron, which ran from 1973 to 1974.

On January 1, 2004, Tamagawa died at the age of 79, just ten days before his eightieth birthday. He was a native of Tokyo.

Partial filmography

Taiyo no nai machi (1954)
Tôkyô wan (1962)
Hidarikî ki no sôgekishâ-Tôkyô wan (1962)
Shitamachi no taiyô (1963) - Detective
Rikugun zangyaku monogatari (1963)
Pale Flower (1964)
Gate of Flesh (1964) - Horidome
Kikyô (1964) - Gô Ushiki
Sâtsu rarete tama ruka (II) (1964)
Kwaidan (1964) - (segment "Chawan no naka")
Story of a Prostitute (1965) - Narita
Kono niji no kieru toki ni mo (1966)
Tokyo Drifter (1966) - Umetani
Chimatsuri kenkajo (1966)
Zero faita dai kûsen (1966)
Fighting Elegy (1966) - Principal
Sâsurai ha ore no ûnmei (1966)
Branded to Kill (1967) - Michihiko Yabuhara
Japan's Longest Day (1967) - Colonel Okitsugu Arao - Chief of Military Affairs Section
Taiketsu (1967)
Ogon no yaro-domo (1967)
Âa Kimi ga Ai (1967) - Ryôsuke, Iwasa
Kurobe no taiyo (1968) - Sayama
Burai hijô (1968) - Gôhara
Wasureru monoka (1968)
Arakure (1969)
Fuji sanchô (1970)
Gekido no showashi 'Gunbatsu''' (1970) - Sukamoto (uncredited)Joshi gakuen: Yabai sotsugyô (1970)Yomigaeru daichi (1971) - KatsuzoKage gari (1972)Graveyard of Honor (1975)Shen quan fei long (1975)Utareru mae-ni ute! (1976) - Inspector TomodaUtamaro: Yume to shiriseba (1977)Hakkodasan (1977) - Captain OkitsuFurimukeba ai (1978) - Shintaro IshiguroJûdai: Keiko no baai (1979) - Tomio TakanoTsigoineruwaizen (1980) - Doctor AmakiKagerô-za'' (1981) - Clerk (final film role)

Japanese male actors
1920s births
2004 deaths
People from Tokyo